Yuendumu is a town in the Northern Territory of Australia,  northwest of Alice Springs on the Tanami Road, within the Central Desert Region local government area. It ranks as one of the larger remote communities in central Australia, and has a thriving community of Aboriginal artists. It is home to Pintubi Anmatjere Warlpiri (PAW) Media, which produced the TV series Bush Mechanics.

History
Yuendumu was established in 1946 by the Native Affairs Branch of the Australian Government to deliver rations and welfare services; the first superintendent was Francis McGarry. In 1947 the Australian Baptist Home Mission was established there. By 1955 many of the Aboriginal people had settled in the town.

Location and demographics
Yuendumu lies on the edge of the Tanami Desert, north-west of Alice Springs within the Yuendumu Aboriginal Lands Trust area, on traditional Anmatyerr land. It includes numerous outstations, and the area borders Mount Doreen, Mount Denison, Central Mount Wedge and Mount Allan pastoral properties.

It is within the Central Desert Region (formerly Central Desert Shire) council area.

The community is largely made up of the Warlpiri and Anmatyerr Aboriginal people, with a population of 759 at the 2016 Australian census.

Art

Yuendumu Doors

In 1982 five Warlpiri elders started painting in a bright "fauve art" style on the 30 doors of the Yuendumu primary school, in a project which became known as the Yuendumu Doors. Their paintings illustrated 36 ancient designs known as kuruwarri (also spelt kurawarri), to teach the children their people's Jukurrpa (often translated as Dreamtime stories), and established the elders as important teachers of the youth. The five men who painted the doors were: 
Paddy Jupurrurla Nelson, Roy Jupurrurla Curtis, Paddy Japaljarri Stewart, Paddy Japaljarri Sims, and Larry Jungarrayi Spencer.

The painting of the doors started the whole Warlpiri art movement, and in addition became a powerful symbol of elders caring for children, and helping them in "two-way education". In the mid-1990s, the doors were removed when the school was upgraded in the mid-1990s, the doors were transferred to the South Australian Museum, where they are held today (2021).

In 2021, the South Australian Museum, the Department of Foreign Affairs and Trade and the National Museum of Australia mounted an exhibition consisting of posters of the doors, to be displayed in Australian embassies around the world, starting with Chengdu in China.

Warlukurlangu Artists

Anthropologist Françoise Dussart provided encouragement to the women to make and sell art, and after some time, the men granted permission to the women to use dots in their acrylic paintings. In 1985 the Warlukurlangu Artists Association was founded at Yuendumu by door painters Stewart and Sims, along with several other senior men and women, including Dolly Nampijinpa Daniels, Darby Jampinjnpa Ross, Jack Jakamarra Ross, Samson Japaljarri Martin and senior women including Uni Nampijinpa Martin, Rosie Nangala Fleming and Maggie Napangardi Watson Incorporated in 1986, it is now called Warlukurlangu Artists Aboriginal Corporation.

Other notable artists who have painted with Warlukurlangu include Kumanjayi Nelson Napaljarri, Norah Nelson Napaljarri, Sheila Brown Napaljarri, and Judy Watson Napangardi.

Contemporary Indigenous Australian artist Kumanjayi Napaljarri Kennedy was a senior woman at Yuendumu, a member of the community council, and was made a Member of the Order of Australia in 1994, for services to the Yuendumu community. Artist Maggie Napaljarri Ross has received the Order of Australia for her work in establishing the Yuendumu Night Patrol.

The art centre produces over 10,000 paintings each year, and sells the same number. In 2022, more than  worth of art by Warlukurlangu Artists sold at the three-day Darwin Aboriginal Art Fair.

Media

For over 25 years the community has also been home to Pintubi Anmatjere Warlpiri (PAW) Media, (formerly Warlpiri Media Association), most famously producing Bush Mechanics, and Aboriginal Rules, which explored the social meaning of Australian rules football in remote communities.

The 2001 TV series Bush Mechanics was located in and around Yuendumu, and an exhibition and book celebrated the iconic series in 2018/2019.

Facilities, sport, events
Services and facilities available in Yuendumu include three community stores, Yuendumu Mediation Centre, 
school, airstrip, swimming pool, the Warlukurlangu art centre, an Aboriginal media organisation (PAW Media), a church, an elderly people's program, women's centre and safe house. Yuendumu retains links with other communities within the region, including Yuelamu, Papunya, Lajamanu, Willowra and Nyirripi.

Yuendumu is home of the Yuendumu Magpies football team, who play in the Central Australian Football League (CAFL) (formerly playing in the Ngurratjuta 'Country' Cup). Yuendumu won the inaugural season of the new Alice Springs competition in 2008. Yuendumu player Liam Jurrah was drafted into the AFL soon after by the Melbourne Football Club.

Yuendumu hosts its annual sports weekend in the first week of August. The event includes football, basketball and softball competitions, attracting teams from other communities around the region. There is also a "Battle of the Bands" night which showcases local bands.

Mt Theo Program

Yuendumu elders founded the Mt Theo Program in 1993, to divert youth from an epidemic of petrol sniffing, which has become a model for substance abuse prevention and youth diversion/development in remote Australian communities. In 2007, Johnny Japangardi Miller "Hooker Creek", Peggy Nampijimpa Brown and Andrew Stojanovski were awarded the Order of Australia Medal (OAM) for their efforts in founding the program and "for service to the community of Yuendumu and the surrounding region of the Northern Territory through programs addressing substance abuse among Indigenous youth". The program grew into a number of services, now administered by the Warlpiri Youth Development Aboriginal Corporation.

Other notable people
Yuendumu leaders who were awarded the Centenary Medal in 2001, which commemorates 100 years of Federation and recognises "citizens and other people who made a contribution to Australian society or government" include Wendy Nungarrayi Brown and Rex Granites.

Yuendumu is the home community of Indigenous activist and former NT Government minister Bess Nungarrayi Price.

Artist Pauline Nakamarra Woods grew up in Yuendumu.

Artist Kumantje Jagamara went to the mission school in Yuendumu.

Artist Alma Nungarrayi Granites lived in Yuendumu.

In the arts and media
The town is mentioned in the 1987 Midnight Oil song "Beds are Burning" (from the Diesel and Dust album): Four wheels scare the cockatoos/From Kintore east to Yuendumu. Midnight Oil and Warumpi Band's 1986 tour to Yuendumu is documented in Andrew McMillan's book Strict Rules: The BlackfellaWhitefella Tour.

In The 2005 PlayStation 2 Video Game Sly 3: Honor Among Thieves, the second chapter "Rumble Down Under" takes place in a fictional Yuendumu in the Australian outback, which is a mining and digging site. Uluru is depicted as surrounding the game's version of Yuendemu.

Climate

References

Further reading

Campbell, Liam (2006) Darby: One hundred years of life in a changing culture, Sydney, ABC Books.
Daly A and Barrett G. (2014) Independent Cost Benefit Analysis of the Yuendumu Mediation and Justice Committee Alice Springs: Central Desert Regional Council. https://www.centraldesert.nt.gov.au/sites/centraldesert.nt.gov.au/files/attachments/yuendumu_cba_0.pdf
Dussart, Francoise (2000) The politics of ritual in an aboriginal settlement: kinship, gender, and the currency of knowledge, Washington D.C., Smithsonian Institution Press.
Meggitt, Mervyn J. (1962) Desert people: A study of the Walpiri Aborigines of Central Australia, Angus & Robertson, London.
Musharbash, Yasmine (2008) Yuendumu everyday: intimacy, immediacy and mobility in a remote Aboriginal settlement, Canberra: Aboriginal Studies Press
Musharbash, Yasmine (2002) "Yuendumu CDEP: The Warlpiri work ethic and Kardiya staff turnover", pp. 153 – 166 in F. Morphy and W.G. Sanders (ed), The Indigenous Welfare Economy and the CDEP Scheme Research Monograph No. 21, Centre for Aboriginal Economic Policy Research, The Australian National University E Press
O'Grady, Frank (1955), Francis of Central Australia, Sydney, Wentworth Books.

External links

Warlpiri Youth Development Aboriginal Corporation - formerly Mt Theo Program
PAW Media and Communications - formerly Warlpiri Media Association
Bush Mechanics
Warlukurlangu Artists Aboriginal Association
Yuendumu artists
Yuendumu community council
Yuendumu Magpies Football Club
The Northern Myth

Towns in the Northern Territory
Central Desert Region
Aboriginal communities in the Northern Territory
Populated places established in 1946
1946 establishments in Australia
Tanami Desert
Warlpiri